Charles Clifford Jones (January 24, 1929 – August 11, 2000) was an American football defensive end in the National Football League for the Washington Redskins.  He attended George Washington University.

1929 births
2000 deaths
Sportspeople from Fayetteville, Arkansas
American football defensive ends
George Washington Colonials football players
Washington Redskins players